Mark O'Brien (July 31, 1949 – July 4, 1999) was an American journalist, poet, and advocate for the disabled. He has been the subject of two films: Breathing Lessons: The Life and Work of Mark O'Brien, which won an Academy Award in 1997, and The Sessions in which he was portrayed by John Hawkes, a film that won the audience award in the U.S. Dramatic category at the Sundance Film Festival in 2012.

The Sessions was based on his essay, "On Seeing a Sex Surrogate", which appeared in the Sun magazine in 1990. The sex surrogate was Cheryl Cohen-Greene. They remained friends until his death.

Personal life
O'Brien contracted polio in 1955 and spent the rest of his life paralyzed and requiring an iron lung. In the iron lung he attended UC Berkeley, produced his poetry and articles, and became an advocate for disabled people. He co-founded a small publishing house, Lemonade Factory, dedicated to poetry written by people with disabilities.  He was featured in two segments of the radio program "This American Life" where he spoke about the occasional opportunities he had to leave the iron lung for short periods of time, trying to find love, and sex.

O'Brien was the author of several volumes of poetry, including Breathing, and an autobiography entitled, How I Became a Human Being: A Disabled Man’s Quest for Independence, written with Gillian Kendall.

O'Brien began seeing a sex surrogate at the age of thirty-eight to lose his virginity. That and the later meeting of him and his life partner, Susan Fernbach, is depicted in the film The Sessions. The sex surrogate was named Cheryl Cohen-Greene. They remained friends until his death.

Education 
O'Brien received a bachelor's degree in English literature and a master's degree in journalism, both from the University of California, Berkeley.

References

External links 
 
This American Life - The Drama Bug  Act 3, "From the Audience Seats"
This American Life - Defying Sickness Act 3, "Iron Man"
Breathing Lessons: The Life and Work of Mark O'Brien  
"Breathing" (poem)
Mark O'Brien at Poetry Foundation

University of California, Berkeley alumni
People with polio
Writers from Boston
1949 births
1999 deaths
20th-century American poets
American male journalists
20th-century American journalists
American male poets
20th-century American male writers
20th-century American non-fiction writers